Grevillea polybractea, commonly known as crimson grevillea, is a species of flowering plant in the family Proteaceae and is endemic to the southeast of continental Australia. It is a spreading shrub with linear to narrowly oblong or narrowly elliptic leaves and pink to red and yellow or green flowers.

Description

Taxonomy
Grevillea polybractea was first formally described in 1927 by Herbert Bennett Williamson in The Victorian Naturalist. The specific epithet (polybractea) means "many bracts".

Distribution and habitat
Crimson grevillea grows in forest with a scrubby understorey, and occurs south of Dubbo and west of Khancoban in New South Wales, and between Corryong and Mount Granya in far north-eastern Victoria.

Conservation status
This grevillea is listed as "endangered" under the Victorian Government Flora and Fauna Guarantee Act 1988 and as "rare in Victoria" on the Department of Sustainability and Environment's Advisory List of Rare or Threatened Plants in Victoria. 26

References

polybractea
Flora of New South Wales
Flora of Victoria (Australia)
Proteales of Australia
Plants described in 1927